Volker Bierbrauer (born 19 September 1940) is a German archaeologist and historian.

Biography 
Volker Bierbrauer was born in Kirn, Germany on 19 September 1940. He received his PhD in prehistory and ancient history at the Ludwig Maximilian University of Munich in 1969. He gained his habilitation in 1977. In 1979, Bierbrauer was appointed to the faculty at the University of Bonn. From 1990 to 2006, he was Chair of Prehistory and Protohistory at the Ludwig Maximilian University of Munich.

Bierbrauer is notable for his research on the archaeology of the Goths and Lombards, and the question of continuity between the classical and medieval period.

Bierbrauer was a Member of the Steering Committee of the Transformation of the Roman World project, which was sponsored by the European Science Foundation. In 2005 he became a full member of the Bavarian Academy of Sciences and Humanities.

Selected works
 Die ostgotischen Grab- und Schatzfunde in Italien, 1969
 Frühgeschichtliche Akkulturationsprozesse in den germanischen Staaten am Mittelmeer (Westgoten, Ostgoten, Langobarden) aus der Sicht des Archäologen, 1980
 Langobarden, Bajuwaren und Romanen im mittleren Alpengebiet im 6. und 7. Jahrhundert, 1993
 Archäologie und Geschichte der Goten vom 1.–7. Jahrhundert, 1994
 Archäologie der Langobarden in Italien, 2005
 Ethnos und Mobilität im 5. Jahrhundert aus archäologischer Sicht, 2008

External links
 Volker Bierbrauer at the website of the Bavarian Academy of Sciences and Humanities

1940 births
German archaeologists
Living people
Ludwig Maximilian University of Munich alumni
Academic staff of the Ludwig Maximilian University of Munich
People from Bad Kreuznach (district)
Prehistorians
Academic staff of the University of Bonn